The 1978 Venezuelan motorcycle Grand Prix was the first round of the 1978 Grand Prix motorcycle racing season. It took place on 19 March 1978 at the San Carlos Circuit.

500cc classification

350 cc classification

250 cc classification

125 cc classification

References

Venezuelan motorcycle Grand Prix
Venezuelan
Motorcycle Grand Prix